Baljit Singh (born October 27, 1962) is a sant and spiritual master in the Sant Mat lineage of contemporary saints.

Initiated by his master, Thakar Singh, in 1998, he began work as a master on February 6, 2005. His teachings include the esoteric practice of listening to the sound current, shabda, nāma, or word manifestation of God and address the problems of finding self-knowledge and God knowledge.

Thakar Singh presented Baljit Singh as his definitive and only successor in a speaking event videotaped before a live audience of about 1.5 million devotees in Pimpalner, India on February 6, 2005.

References

External links
 Santmat.net: Sant Baljit Singh

1962 births
Living people
Indian spiritual teachers
Contemporary Sant Mat
Sant Mat gurus